Mohammed Akkad is a Syrian politician and the former Governor of Aleppo.

Akkad was appointed of Aleppo by Syrian President Bashar al-Assad on 16 August 2012 during the Battle of Aleppo replacing Moafaq Khallouf.

During the Syrian civil war Akkad became the primary spokesman for the Syrian government in Aleppo.

References

Living people
People of the Syrian civil war
Syrian politicians
Year of birth missing (living people)